Flint Tønsberg is the women's handball team of the Norwegian multi-sports club IL Flint based in Tønsberg, Vestfold og Telemark. The team plays in REMA 1000-ligaen, the top division in the country, since its promotion in 2020.

Team

Current squad
Squad for the 2020–21 season

Goalkeepers
 12  Eline Fagerheim
 18  Zaynab Elmrani
 71  Camilla Martinsen
 91  Synne Reiersen
Wingers
RW
 23  Charlotte Koffeld Iversen
 27  Henriette Jarneid
LW 
 6  Nora Bugge
 29  Julianne Drevland Bjørnøe
 49  Julie Dybdahl
Line players
 2  Aurora Aurheim
 8  Synne Fossheim 
 26  Martine Grip Øvreberg 
 28  Julia Gellein Vangen

Back players
 3  Karoline Müller Lislien
 9  Karoline Fahlberg
 10  Elise Johnsen
 11  Malin Alice Lundemo
 13  Elise Vedeler
 19  Celina Vatne
 20  Gabi Sørvik-Hansen
 21  Sanne Løkka Hagen
 22  Felicia Celine Tangen
 24  Mia Leikvold Trapnes
 25  Andrea Varvin Fredriksen

2021–2022 Transfers

Joining
  Marianne Iversen (CB) (comeback)
  Majra Mitrovic (LB/CB) (from  Bærum Topphåndball)
  Nora Asbjørnsen (LB) (from  Nordstrand IF)
  Vivi Storvang (GK) (from  Sandefjord Håndball)
  Sofie Celius (LB) (from  Reistad IL)
  Anna Klausen Jacobsen (RB/RW) (from  Gjerpen IF)
  Ellen Marie Folkvord (LP) (from  Storhamar HE)
  Kristiane Stormoen (LB/CB) (from  Storhamar HE)

Leaving
  Mari Finstad Bergum (LB) (to  Nantes Atlantique Handball)  effective immediately
  Eline Fagerheim (GK) (currently pausing her career)
  Mia Vik Gabrielsen (LW) (to  Larvik HK) 
  Nora Bugge (LW) (currently pausing her career)
  Karoline Fahlberg (CB) (to  SIK Håndbold) 
  Synne Fossheim (LP) (to  Molde Elite)

Technical staff
 Head coach: Zarko Pejovic
 Assistant coach: Marianne Iversen

Notable former club players
  Emily Stang Sando
  Renate Saastad Sømme
  Ellen Marie Folkvord
  Pia Narvesen
  Marianne Iversen
  Gabriela Moreschi
  Kristiane Stormoen
  Mari Finstad Bergum

References

Norwegian handball clubs
Handball clubs established in 1917
1917 establishments in Norway
Tønsberg